The San Gorgonio Wilderness is located in the eastern San Bernardino Mountains, in San Bernardino County and into northern Riverside County, Southern California.

Geography
The wilderness is part of the eastern slope of the San Bernardino Mountains, with topography rapidly changing from low, rolling foothills and canyons to steep, rugged mountains. Because of this elevation gradient, the wilderness reflects a transition between desert, coastal and mountain environments, including the different types of vegetation representative of each elevation.

The United States Congress designated the San Gorgonio Wilderness in 1964.

Sand to Snow National Monument
The San Gorgonio Wilderness is now within the Sand to Snow National Monument, established by President Obama in February 2016. It is managed jointly by the San Bernardino National Forest and the Bureau of Land Management.

See also

References

External links
 Recreation.gov: San Gorgonio Wilderness area
 Wilderness.net: San Gorgonio Wilderness
 San Gorgonio Wilderness Association

Wilderness areas of California
San Bernardino Mountains
Sand to Snow National Monument
Protected areas of San Bernardino County, California
Protected areas of Riverside County, California
Bureau of Land Management areas in California
San Bernardino National Forest
IUCN Category Ib
Protected areas established in 1964
1964 establishments in California